Laaounate is a small town and rural commune in Sidi Bennour Province of the Casablanca-Settat region of Morocco. At the time of the 2004 census, the commune had a total population of 18,258 people living in 3188 households.

Notable people 
Abdelaziz Stati, Moroccan Chaabi singer 
Hicham Aboucherouane, Former international footballer

References

Populated places in Sidi Bennour Province
Rural communes of Casablanca-Settat